Aglaia coriacea is a species of plant in the family Meliaceae. It is found in Kalimantan, Indonesia, and Peninsular Malaysia.

References

coriacea
Flora of Malesia
Vulnerable flora of Asia
Taxonomy articles created by Polbot